A counterpunch is a boxing punch that immediately follows an attack launched by an opponent. It exploits the opening created in an opponent's guard.

Technique
Counterpunchers are tactical, defensive fighters who rely on opponent mistakes in order to gain an attacking advantage to get score cards or the chance of a knockout. They use their well-rounded defensive skills to avoid or block shots in order immediately to place well-timed punches on opponents who have lost their guard.

Boxers who fight against counter punchers must constantly feint and conceal their offensive punches to prevent anticipation for the counterpunch. Successful boxers who use this style must have good reflexes, intelligence, punch accuracy and better-than-average hand speed.

Notable exponents

 Young Corbett III
 Mike Tyson
 Marvin Hagler
 Bernard Hopkins
 Ricardo Lopez 
 Juan Manuel Marquez
 Canelo Álvarez
Chancellor Pharaoh Rogers,.
 Floyd Mayweather Jr.
 Willie Pep
 Jerry Quarry
 Salvador Sanchez
 James Toney
 Pernell Whitaker

Boxing terminology
Kickboxing terminology